The Navajo People and Uranium Mining (2006) is a non-fiction book edited by Doug Brugge, Timothy Benally, and Esther Yazzie-Lewis; it uses oral histories to tell the stories of Navajo Nation families and miners in the uranium mining industry. The foreword is written by Stewart L. Udall, former U.S. Secretary of the Interior.

The Navajo People and Uranium Mining has 12 chapters. Seven chapters contain stories of the Navajo told through interviews of the miners or their families. The remaining chapters describe the health effects related to uranium mining, and "how these medical issues adversely affected the lives of the miners and their families".

See also 
 Uranium mining and the Navajo people
 Church Rock uranium mill spill
 Struggle for the Land

References

Uranium mining on the Navajo Nation
Uranium mining
2006 non-fiction books
2006 in the environment
Books about nuclear issues
Navajo people
Books about indigenous rights
Indigenous peoples and the environment
Uranium politics
Indigenous politics in North America
University of New Mexico Press books